An annular solar eclipse occurred on December 14, 1955. A solar eclipse occurs when the Moon passes between Earth and the Sun, thereby totally or partly obscuring the image of the Sun for a viewer on Earth. An annular solar eclipse occurs when the Moon's apparent diameter is smaller than the Sun's, blocking most of the Sun's light and causing the Sun to look like an annulus (ring). An annular eclipse appears as a partial eclipse over a region of the Earth thousands of kilometres wide.

Annularity was visible from French Equatorial Africa (the part now belonging to Chad), Libya, Anglo-Egyptian Sudan (the part now belonging to Sudan) including the capital city Khartoum, French Somaliland (today's Djibouti) including the capital Djibouti City, British Somaliland (today's Somaliland) including the capital city Hargeisa, the Trust Territory of Somaliland (today's Somalia), the Maldives, Andaman and Nicobar Islands, Burma, Thailand including the capital city Bangkok, Cambodia, Laos, North Vietnam and South Vietnam (now belonging to Vietnam), China, British Hong Kong, Taiwan, and Ryukyu Islands. It was the third central solar eclipse visible from Bangkok from 1948 to 1958, where it is rare for a large city to witness four central solar eclipses in just 9.945 years. This was the 20th member Solar Saros 141, and the last of first set of solar eclipses without a penumbral internal contact (without a penumbra northern limit), the next event is the 1973 Dec 24 event, which is the first of 19 solar eclipses with a penumbral internal contact (has penumbral northern and southern limits) until 2298 Jul 09. Occurring only one day before apogee (December 15, 1955), the Moon's apparent diameter was smaller.

The duration of annularity at maximum eclipse (closest to but slightly shorter than the longest duration) was 12 minutes, 9.17 seconds in the Indian Ocean. It was the longest annular solar eclipse from December 17, 168 to January 14, 3080. Among all the 23740 solar eclipses from 4000 BC to 6000 AD, 7881 are annular, and only 3 of them are longer than this one.

More details 

Eclipse Magnitude: 0.91764

Eclipse Obscuration: 0.84206

Gamma: 0.42658

Saros Series: 141st (20 of 70)

Greatest Eclipse: 14 Dec 1955 07:01:53.7 UTC (07:02:25.1 TD)

Ecliptic Conjunction: 14 Dec 1955 07:07:02.4 UTC (07:07:33.8 TD)

Equatorial Conjunction: 14 Dec 1955 07:03:46.6 UTC (07:04:18.1 TD)

Sun right ascension: 17.38

Moon right ascension: 17.38

Earth's shadow right ascension: 5.38

Sun declination: -23.2

Moon declination: -22.8

Earth's shadow declination: 23.2

Sun diameter: 1949.8 arcseconds

Moon diameter: 1765.0 arcseconds

Path Width at Greatest Eclipse: 345.7 km (214.8 mi)

Path Width at Greatest Duration: 345.8 km (214.9 mi)

Central Duration at Greatest Eclipse: 12 minutes, 9.17 seconds

Central Duration at Greatest Duration: 12 minutes, 9.23 seconds

Extreme duration 
With a maximum length of annularity duration of 12 minutes and 9.17 seconds, this is the longest solar eclipse in the millennium, as well as the longest duration in Saros 141 and one of the longest eclipses ever observed. The annular path begins in northern Africa, then passing Maldives (near the maximum eclipse), then crosses just southern edge of Sri Lanka, then the track continues to some countries in Indochina and the track ends just slightly after the track passes Taiwan.

Related eclipses

Solar eclipses of 1953–1956

Saros 141

Inex series

Metonic series

Notes

References

1955 12 14
1955 in science
1955 12 14
December 1955 events